David Rodríguez Uribe (born May 5, 2002) is a professional soccer player who plays as an attacking midfielder for MLS Next Pro club Austin FC II, on loan from Liga MX team Atlético San Luis. Born in Mexico, he represented the United States national under-17 team.

Personal
David's older brother Arturo is also a professional footballer. He plays with Phoenix Rising.

Career statistics

Club

Honours
North Texas SC
USL League One Regular Season: 2019
USL League One Championship: 2019

References

External links
 
 David Rodriguez at FC Dallas
 
 
 

2002 births
Living people
People from San Luis Potosí City
American soccer players
United States men's youth international soccer players
Mexican footballers
American sportspeople of Mexican descent
Mexican emigrants to the United States
Association football midfielders
North Texas SC players
USL League One players
Atlético San Luis footballers
Phoenix Rising FC players
USL Championship players